William Street is one of the main thoroughfares of central Limerick City, Ireland. The street starts at a junction with O'Connell Street (Limerick's main thoroughfare) and continues in a south-east direction, where it is called Upper William Street. The street is named after William Pery, 1st Baron Glentworth a relation of Edmund Sexton Pery who is credited with the development of the present day Limerick City Centre area known as Newtown Pery.

Architectural makeup

The street is architecturally Georgian in style like much of the Limerick City Centre area. There was a major fire on William Street in May 1860. Prior to the construction of the Limerick Southern Ring Road the street formed part of the N24 route between Limerick & Waterford. It is now part of the R527 road.

References

Streets in Limerick (city)